Edoardo De Angelis (born 31 August 1978) is an Italian film director and screenwriter.

Biography
In 2006 he graduated in directing at the Centro Sperimentale di Cinematografia. In 2011, he made his debut feature film Mozzarella Stories. Serbian director Emir Kusturica in an interview granted to Il Venerdì di Repubblica called Edoardo De Angelis a "visionary talent".

In 2014 he made his second feature film Perez., presented in an official selection out of competition at the 71st Venice International Film Festival.

In 2016 he wrote and directed Indivisible, presented at Venice Days as part of the 73rd Venice International Film Festival. The film won 6 David di Donatello Awards and 5 Silver Ribbons.

His fourth film, The Vice of Hope, has been presented at the 2018 Rome Film Festival and awarded with the BNL People's Choice Award.

Filmography
 Mozzarella Stories (2011)
 Perez. (2014)
 Indivisible (2016)
 The Vice of Hope (2018)

References

External links
 

1978 births
Living people
Film people from Naples
Italian film directors
Italian screenwriters
Italian male screenwriters